Harbin Hot Springs is a non-profit hot spring retreat and workshop center at Harbin Springs in Lake County, Northern California. Named after Matthew Harbin, a pioneer who settled in the Lake County area. It is located about two hours northeast of the San Francisco Bay Area, in the United States. The facility was partially destroyed in the Valley Fire in September 2015, and was temporarily closed. In January 2019 it partially reopened, including the main pools and sauna, and a limited cafeteria service.

Location

Three springs, known as the Arsenic, Iron and Sulphur springs, rise close together in a ravine on the west of a branch of Putah Creek.

Springs

The flow from Hot Sulphur was said to be . A fresh water spring filled a  tank in two days, which was used for fire purposes.

History 

The springs had been used by the local people before European settlers arrived. Around 1856 a settler named James M. Harbin took control of the land occupied by the Harbin Hot Springs, and gave his name to the Harbin Springs and the Harbin Mountain that rises above the springs. By 1870 a new owner, Richard Williams, had built the Harbin Springs Health and Pleasure Resort, with a large hotel on the slope below the springs. The region is prone to wildfires and, over the years, successive lodges have been rebuilt when they burned down.

By 1909 there were accommodations for around 200 people in a hotel, a three-story rooming house, eight or ten cottages and a dozen tent houses. A large building held a gymnasium and dancing floor. In 1913 they were owned by Mrs. Margaret Matthews of Vallejo, who was leasing them to Booth, Carr and Booth. The resort could accommodate 300 people. There were two steam baths and two swimming pools, of which the larger was outdoors. One of the steam baths was a covered pool from the Hot Sulphur spring. Harbin Hot Springs issued several postcards advertising the resort in the 1920s and 1930s.

By 1969 the property was owned by Sandia Corporation, which was interested in the potential for geothermal energy. In the late 1960s and early 1970s, the property was run as a commune with the name Harbinger commune, "centered around a man named Don Hamrick, a charismatic fellow who wore business suits and combined science with spiritualism in his lectures/sermons". In 1969, Harbinger had about 120 people, but ultimately, the community did not thrive.
In 1972 Robert Hartley bought the property and renovated the run-down facilities.

He sold it to Heart Consciousness Church in 1992. As of 2012, the clothing-optional retreat center was known as an outdoor spa with a New Age ambiance, where Watsu was developed. 

The resort was evacuated because of the Valley Fire on September 12, 2015. By September 14, Harbin was almost completely destroyed by the fire with only the pool complex largely intact. SunRay Kelly had designed and built the Harbin Hot Springs Temple, a yoga and meditation space, which burned down in 2015. In January 2019 it partially reopened, including the main pools and sauna, and a limited cafeteria service.

Modern establishment 

Robert Hartley (also known as Ishvara) bought the land in 1972 to be a Gestalt center. Sold to the Heart Consciousness Church (HCC) in 1975, Harbin/HCC operates as a Retreat Center. Harbin/HCC maintains a more specifically religious organization, the New Age Church of Being, incorporated in 1996. Harbin is a center for the expression of New Age beliefs. Harbin's clothing-optional policy, its pools, and the natural beauty of the local landscape are part of Harbin's appeal to visitors, who must agree to membership, if only temporarily, for admission.

Harbin has been a center for the development of new modes of healing and personal development, including Watsu (water shiatsu), a massage technique created by Harold Dull at Harbin in the early 1980s. Watsu, based on gently moving the body through water, is now practiced in spas throughout the world.

References

Sources

Further reading 

2015 disestablishments in California
Springs of Lake County, California
Buildings and structures in Lake County, California
Former Native American populated places in California
Hot springs of California
Intentional communities in the United States
Naturism in the United States
New Age organizations
Spa towns in California
Tourist attractions in Lake County, California